Gibraltar is a rural community of the Halifax Regional Municipality in the Canadian province of Nova Scotia on Nova Scotia Route 357, approximately 15 km north of Musquodoboit Harbour.

Recreation and facilities
There are no permanent residents here, but it is the northern terminus of the Musquodoboit Trailway, a 14.5 km multi-use rail-to-trail. In addition, two of the Musquodoboit Trailways' wilderness trails, namely the North Granite Ridge Trail and the Gibraltar Rock Trail, begin here.

References

 Explore HRM

Communities in Halifax, Nova Scotia
General Service Areas in Nova Scotia